The Black Country Development Corporation was an urban development corporation established in May 1987 to develop land in the Metropolitan Boroughs of Sandwell and Walsall in England.

Its flagship developments included the Black Country Spine Road. During its lifetime 11.9m sq.ft. of non-housing development and 3,774 housing units were built. Around 21,440 new jobs were created and some £1,150m of private finance was leveraged in. The Chairman was Sir William Francis and, subsequently, George Carter and the Chief Executive was David Morgan. It was dissolved in 1998.

The Black Country Spine Road was notable for providing the area around Wednesbury with a dual carriageway as well as reducing congestion on the narrower roads which surrounded it. The new road, which was opened in two phases in 1995, also freed up several square miles of previously inaccessible land which was soon developed for industrial and commercial use.

References

Sandwell
Walsall
Organizations established in 1987
Organizations disestablished in 1998
Organisations based in the West Midlands (county)
History of the West Midlands (county)
Defunct public bodies of the United Kingdom
Development Corporations of the United Kingdom
Black Country